Columbia is one of the village subdivisions of the town of Washington, Tyne and Wear, England.

References

Cross-reference

Sources 

 

Populated places in Tyne and Wear
Washington, Tyne and Wear